Impro: Improvisation and the Theatre is a book written in 1979 by theatre educator Keith Johnstone. The book is divided into four sections: "Status", "Spontaneity", "Narrative Skills", and "Masks and Trance". Much of the book is based on his experiences as a teacher and as an associate director of the Royal Court Theatre in London.

References

External links
 -excerpt from The Stage newspaper

Improvisational theatre
Non-fiction books about theatre
1979 non-fiction books
Faber and Faber books